Dmitri Rodionovich Kalugin (born 28 March 1998) is a Russian football player.

Club career
He made his debut in the Russian Football National League for FC Luch Vladivostok on 8 August 2018 in a game against FC Nizhny Novgorod.

References

External links
 Profile by Russian Football National League

1998 births
Sportspeople from Vladivostok
Living people
Russian footballers
Association football midfielders
FC Luch Vladivostok players
FC Fakel Voronezh players
Russian First League players
Russian Second League players